Mount Ann is a 5,840-foot-elevation (1,780-meter) mountain summit located in the North Cascades in Whatcom County of Washington state. It is set within the Mount Baker Wilderness, on land managed by Mount Baker-Snoqualmie National Forest, and is only one mile outside the boundary of North Cascades National Park. Mount Ann is situated immediately southwest of line parent Mount Shuksan and northeast of Mount Baker. Mount Ann can be seen south of Artist Point which is at the end of the Mount Baker Highway. Precipitation runoff from the mountain drains into Swift Creek and Shuksan Creek, which empty into Baker Lake. The mountain is unofficially named in association with nearby Lake Ann. Due to its proximity to the Mt. Baker Ski Area, Mount Ann is a winter destination for skiing and snowshoeing.

Climate

Mount Ann is located in the marine west coast climate zone of western North America. Most weather fronts originate in the Pacific Ocean, and travel east toward the Cascade Mountains. As fronts approach the North Cascades, they are forced upward by the peaks of the Cascade Range (Orographic lift), causing them to drop their moisture in the form of rain or snowfall onto the Cascades. As a result, the west side of the North Cascades experiences high precipitation, especially during the winter months in the form of snowfall. Mount Ann is situated near the Mt. Baker Ski Area, which recorded the world's greatest snowfall for one season, 1,140 inches (95.0 ft; 29.0 m), which was recorded during the 1998–1999 season. Because of maritime influence, snow tends to be wet and heavy, resulting in high avalanche danger. During winter months, weather is usually cloudy, but due to high pressure systems over the Pacific Ocean that intensify during summer months, there is often little or no cloud cover during the summer.

Geology
The North Cascades features some of the most rugged topography in the Cascade Range with craggy peaks, ridges, and deep glacial valleys. Geological events occurring many years ago created the diverse topography and drastic elevation changes over the Cascade Range leading to the various climate differences.

The history of the formation of the Cascade Mountains dates back millions of years ago to the late Eocene Epoch. With the North American Plate overriding the Pacific Plate, episodes of volcanic igneous activity persisted. In addition, small fragments of the oceanic and continental lithosphere called terranes created the North Cascades about 50 million years ago.

During the Pleistocene period dating back over two million years ago, glaciation advancing and retreating repeatedly scoured the landscape leaving deposits of rock debris. The U-shaped cross section of the river valleys are a result of recent glaciation. Uplift and faulting in combination with glaciation have been the dominant processes which have created the tall peaks and deep valleys of the North Cascades area.

Gallery

See also

 Geology of the Pacific Northwest
 Geography of the North Cascades

References

External links
Mt. Baker Wilderness U.S. Forest Service

Mountains of Washington (state)
Mountains of Whatcom County, Washington
North Cascades
Cascade Range
North American 1000 m summits
Mount Baker-Snoqualmie National Forest